The Palisades Interstate Parkway (PIP) is a  limited-access highway in the U.S. states of New Jersey and New York. The parkway is a major commuter route into New York City from Rockland and Orange counties in New York and Bergen County in New Jersey. The southern terminus of the route is at the George Washington Bridge in Fort Lee, New Jersey, where it connects to Interstate 95 (I-95),  New Jersey Route 4, U.S. 1, U.S. 9, and US 46. Its northern terminus is at a traffic circle in Fort Montgomery, New York, where the PIP meets US 9W and US 202 at the Bear Mountain Bridge. At exit 18, the PIP forms a concurrency with US 6 for the remaining duration of its run.

The route is named for the Hudson River Palisades, a line of cliffs rising along the western side of the Hudson River. The PIP is designated, but not signed as Route 445 in New Jersey and New York State Route 987C (NY 987C), an unsigned reference route, in New York. As with most parkways in the New York metropolitan area, commercial traffic is prohibited from using the PIP. The Palisades Interstate Parkway was built from 1947–1958, and fully opened to traffic on August 28, 1958.

Route description

The mainline of the parkway is designated as Route 445 in New Jersey and NY 987C in New York. The latter is one of New York's reference routes. A  spur connecting the parkway to US 9W in Fort Lee, New Jersey, is designated Route 445S. All three designations are unsigned and used only for inventory purposes. The parkway is owned and maintained by the Palisades Interstate Park Commission but occasional maintenance is performed by the New Jersey and New York state departments of transportation. Commercial vehicles are prohibited on the entire length of the Palisades Interstate Parkway. As of October 2018, it is 55 mph for the entire length.

New Jersey

The Palisades Interstate Parkway begins at the George Washington Bridge (GWB) in Fort Lee, New Jersey. Passengers from the upper level of the GWB can directly access the PIP northbound, while passengers from the lower level of the bridge must travel through GWB Plaza on US 9W before getting on the parkway. Passengers traveling northbound on the New Jersey Turnpike (I-95) must be in local lanes to directly get on the PIP. Once the PIP leaves the GWB, it proceeds north along the New Jersey Palisades, past the Englewood Cliffs Service Area. Unlike service areas further north along the parkway, there are two in Englewood, one for northbound drivers and one for southbound drivers. The others are in the center median shared by drivers going in both directions. There are also three different scenic lookout points over the Palisades near the northern tip of the island of Manhattan at the Harlem River. After this, the PIP parallels US 9W and the Hudson River for its entire run in New Jersey. The PIP leaves New Jersey into New York in the borough of Rockleigh.

The entire New Jersey portion of the Palisades Interstate Parkway is within Bergen County. It is designated as a state scenic byway known as the Palisades Scenic Byway. The PIP, the New Jersey Turnpike, Interstate 278, and Interstate 676 are the only highways that use sequential exit numbering in New Jersey; all others in the state are based on mileage, except for the Atlantic City–Brigantine Connector in Atlantic City, which uses lettered exits (no numerals).

New York
The parkway enters Rockland County in the hamlet of Palisades. At about the border the PIP changes direction from due north along the Hudson River to a north-west direction. Shortly after the Kings Ferry Service Area in the center median, the first two exits in New York are key exits for two colleges in Rockland County. Exit 5 provides a link to St. Thomas Aquinas College, and exit 6 provides a link to Dominican College. In West Nyack, the PIP has a key interchange with the New York State Thruway (I-87 and I-287). This intersection is about seven miles (11 km) west of the Tappan Zee Bridge. After the PIP's interchange with the NY Thruway, the PIP turns slightly north-east. At exit 13, the PIP intersects US 202 as the route crosses south of Harriman State Park in Mount Ivy. This is the first of two meetings between the PIP and US 202. At exit 15, the PIP has its last busy intersection in Rockland County with County Route 106 (CR 106, formerly part of NY 210) in Stony Point. From here, the PIP enters Harriman State Park, and at exit 16, the PIP intersects Lake Welch Parkway, which is one of several parkways commissioned within the park.

The parkway enters Orange County north of Lake Welch Parkway at exit 16 and south of the Palisades Interstate Park Commission Visitor Center, located in the center median in what was originally a parkway service area. The first interchange in Orange County is exit 17 at Anthony Wayne Recreation Area. At exit 18, the PIP intersects US 6 and Seven Lakes Drive. US 6 west heads toward the Thruway and NY 17 five miles (8 km) west in Harriman. US 6 east forms the PIP's only concurrency for the last two miles (3 km) of the PIP's run. Seven Lakes Drive joins the two routes for one mile (1.6 km) before departing at exit 19. The two routes then enter Bear Mountain State Park in an eastern direction. Finally, the Palisades Interstate Parkway meets its end at US 9W and US 202 at a traffic circle near the Hudson River and the Bear Mountain Bridge. US 6 and US 202 head east over the bridge, while US 9W heads north toward the United States Military Academy in West Point. (Southbound US 9W, breaking off to the right, is the same road as westbound US 202.)

History

In 1933–34, the first thoughts of a Palisades Interstate Parkway were developed by engineer and environmentalist William A. Welch, who was general manager and chief engineer of the Palisades Interstate Park Commission. The plan was to build a parkway to connect the New Jersey Palisades with the state parks along the Hudson River in Rockland and Orange counties. Welch would soon garner the support of John D. Rockefeller, who donated  of land along the New Jersey Palisades overlooking the Hudson River in 1933. With this favorable momentum for the new route, the proposed route was accepted as a Civil Works Administration project under Franklin D. Roosevelt's New Deal coalition. However, the New Jersey Highway Commission did not support construction, so the idea of a parkway was put on hold.

During the 1940s, Rockefeller renewed the push for a parkway along the New Jersey Palisades, and teamed with ultimate PIP planner, Robert Moses, to establish and design the parkway. The plan originally was to have the PIP stretch from the Garden State Parkway, along the Hudson River, to the George Washington Bridge, and then north along its present-day route ending at the Bear Mountain Bridge. This southern extension was never built, but construction began on the current PIP in New York on April 1, 1947. Construction on the New Jersey portion began about one year later. Construction was delayed twice due to material shortages, but that did not stop the PIP from being opened in stages during the 1940s and 1950s. The route was completed in New Jersey in 1957, and on August 28, 1958, the final piece of the PIP was completed between exits 5 and 9 in southern Rockland County.

The PIP is known for its stone arch overpasses throughout its route and its several scenic overlooks in New Jersey. All sorts of unique trees and flowers can be seen along the route as well. In 1998, because of all the natural and constructed beauty, the PIP was designated as a national landmark by the National Park Service.

Exit list
While most highways in the U.S. reset their mile markers and exit numbers when crossing a state line, the Palisades Parkway does not reset either.

Rest areas

There are some rest areas on the Palisades Interstate Parkway.

 Sparkill (located just south of Exit 5, fuel and convenience store. Open 24 Hours. Park and Ride also available. Accessible both sides.) (New York)
 Englewood Cliffs (located past exit 1 just before the George Washington Bridge, fuel and convenience store. There are two separate rest areas on both sides. Phone service is also available.) (New Jersey)
 Alpine Lookout (Alpine): (North side only. Located near exit 2. Parking/scenic view area only. No fuel.) (New Jersey)
 Rockefeller Lookout (Englewood Cliffs): (North side only. Parking/scenic view area only. No fuel.) (New Jersey)
 Bear Mountain/Tomkins Cove (located between exits 16 and 17. Information and book store. No fuel. Accessible both sides.) (New York)
 State Line Lookout (Visitor center and lookout. No fuel). (New Jersey)

Palisades Interstate Parkway Police
The Palisades Interstate Parkway Police is a highway law enforcement agency for protecting the Palisades Interstate Parkway and to enforce state and city laws in the New Jersey section of highway. Headquartered in Alpine, New Jersey on Alpine Approach Road. The department consists of one chief, two lieutenants, five sergeants, and seventeen patrol officers. There are also security guards available who were trained and hired for by the police academy. Other than patrol cars, the Palisades Interstate Parkway Police also uses police boats for marine patrols and a bicycle unit.

See also

References

External links

Palisades Interstate Parkway
Palisades Interstate Parkway Police
An enlarged view of road jurisdiction at the Fort Lee approaches to the George Washington Bridge
Google maps satellite image of the southern end of the Parkway
Palisades Parkway (NJ 445) (Greater New York Roads)
Palisades Parkway (NY) (Greater New York Roads)

Historic districts on the National Register of Historic Places in New Jersey
Transportation in Bergen County, New Jersey
Historic districts in Orange County, New York
Historic districts in Rockland County, New York
Parkways in New York (state)
State highways in New Jersey
Palisades Interstate Park system
Robert Moses projects
Transportation in Orange County, New York
Transportation in Rockland County, New York
Limited-access roads in New Jersey
U.S. Route 6
Parkways in the United States
Roads on the National Register of Historic Places in New Jersey
National Register of Historic Places in Bergen County, New Jersey
Parks on the National Register of Historic Places in New Jersey